Royal Consort Sug-ui of the Geochang Shin clan (Hangul: 숙의 신씨, Hanja: 淑儀 愼氏; ? – 1476) was a concubine of Crown Prince Yi Jang, the eldest son of King Sejo of Joseon.

Biography 
The future Royal Consort Sug-ui was born as the daughter of Shin Seon-gyeong and Lady Han of the Cheongju Han clan. Her birth date is unknown.

On August 23, 1456 (lunar calendar), she was selected to become the concubine of Crown Prince Uigyeong and was granted the title Consort So-hun (junior 5th rank concubine of the Crown Prince; 소훈, 昭訓). She entered the palace on that same year.

In 1457, the Crown Prince passed away and left no issue with the consort.

When her husband was honored as King, Lady Shin was promoted to the 2nd junior rank concubine of the King (숙의, 淑儀) as Royal Consort Sug-ui.

She died on May 16, 1476 (lunar calendar), during the 7th year of King Seongjong's reign.

Family 
 Father: Shin Seon-gyeong (신선경, 慎先庚)
 Mother: Lady Han of the Cheongju Han clan (청주 한씨)
 Husband: Yi Jang, King Deokjong (조선 덕종) (3 October 1438 – 20 September 1457)
 Father-in-law: King Sejo of Joseon (조선 세조) (2 November 1417 – 23 September 1468)
 Mother-in-law: Queen Jeonghui of the Paepyeong Yun clan (정희왕후 윤씨) (8 December 1418 – 6 May 1483)

References

Royal consorts of the Joseon dynasty
Year of birth unknown
1476 deaths
15th-century Korean people
15th-century Korean women